Edward Pierce or Pearce (1630–1695)  was a 17th century English sculptor and architectural sculptor. He was also an avid collector of books, drawings and plaster figures.

Life
He was the son of Edward Pearce (d. 1658), a painter and stainer, noted for his decorative paintings in Old Somerset House.

He is thought to have trained under Edward Bird working under Christopher Wren on London church interiors. In 1656 he was made a Freeman of The Painters and Stainers Company. In the 1650s he lived at the lower end of Surrey Street in the parish of St Botolph's, Aldgate.

His first wood carvings were for Sir Charles Wolseley, 2nd Baronet at Wolseley Hall, where he was responsible for the dining-room.

The Great Fire of London in 1666 proved a major boost to his career and he went into a long-term working relationship with Christopher Wren - executing the interiors for many of Wren's churches (built to replace the many destroyed churches).

He lived most of his life in a house on Arundel Street, but died on Surrey Street died in March or April of 1695 with his will being granted on 27 April 1695. He is buried only a dozen metres north in the churchyard of St Clement Danes, close to some of his finest interior work.

Recognition
Held in high esteem in his own lifetime an English-owned villa in Rome in 1711 is said to have been decorated by the heads of Palladio, Raphael and Buonarroti on one side and Inigo Jones, Isaac Fuller and Pierce on the other. Many of his drawings are held in the British Museum, Soane Museum and Ashmolean Museum. Some where earlier mis-attributed to William Talman.

He was portrayed at least twice:
Joint portrait with his father by Alexander Bannerman
Portrait with his bust of Milton by Isaac Fuller

Wren churches

Pierce worked closely with Wren on many projects, creating interiors for Wren's noble exteriors:
St Swithin, London Stone on Cannon Street
St Benet Fink
St Andrew, Holborn
St Paul's Cathedral
St Clement Danes (1680/1)
St Lawrence Jewry
St Matthew Friday Street

Other known works

Interiors at Wolseley Hall (now demolished)
Interiors at the Church of St Lawrence Jewry (interior destroyed in Blitz)
Monument to Lord and Lady Maynard (1670) at Little Easton
Carving at Emmanuel College, Cambridge (1670)
Frontage carvings on Guildhall, London (1670 to 1673)
Carvings on the Coopers Hall (1671/2) for the Worshipful Company of Coopers
Carvings on the Grocers Hall (1680–84) for the Worshipful Company of Grocers
Dragon weather vane for St Mary-le-Bow
Pediment and coat-of-arms at Combe Abbey for Lord Craven (1683) under William Winde
Carvings at Hampstead Marshall (1661) under William Winde
Staircase at Sudbury Hall in Derbyshire (1677)
Stone Font and timber interior in St Matthews Church on Friday Street (1685)
Bust of John Milton (1656) for Christ's College, Cambridge
Terracotta bust of Oliver Cromwell for the National Portrait Gallery, London now in the British Museum
Bronze bust of Oliver Cromwell (1672) for the London museum
Bust of Christopher Wren (1673) in the Ashmolean Museum 
Statue of Sir Thomas Gresham for the Royal Exchange, London (c.1680)
Bust of Baldwin Hamey the Younger (1680) at the Royal College of Physicians
Bust of Thomas Evans (1680) for the Worshipful Company of Painter-Stainers
Wooden statue of Sir William Walworth (c.1680) for the Hall of the Fishmongers Company
Statue of Queen Elizabeth I for the Royal Exchange, London (1685) for the Worshipful Company of Fishmongers
Statue of King Edward III for the Royal Exchange, London (1685) for the Worshipful Company of Skinners
Statue of King Henry V for the Royal Exchange, London (1685) for the Worshipful Company of Goldsmiths
Pediment over entrance at Bishop's Palace, Lichfield (1687)
Public water cistern on Pancras Lane (1673)
Carvings for New Hall in Winchester College (1681)
Carving at Hampton Court (1689)
Seating and fountain at Whitehall Palace (1695)
Ornate chimney-pieces for Castle Bromwich Hall in Warwick (1690)
Gate posts at Horseheath Hall in Cambridgeshire for Lady Alington (1665)
Gate posts at Clare College, Cambridge
Dragons on The Monument
White marble vases for Hampton Court - one now at Windsor Castle (1700) completed by John Nost
The curious column which forms the centrepiece for Seven Dials, London (1693)

Family
In 1651 he married Anne Smith, a widow, who died in 1695.

References

1630 births
1695 deaths
People from London
English sculptors